Carla Hassan (also known as, Carla Zakhem-Hassan) is an American business executive.

Biography
Carla Zakhem-Hassan is a Lebanese war refugee. She received a bachelor's degree from the University of Colorado and an MBA from the Thunderbird School of Global Management. In 2021, Hassan was named Chief Marketing Officer for JPMorgan Chase & Co. Prior to joining JPMorgan Chase, Hassan was named the chief marketing officer at Citigroup in 2020, having joined the company in 2018. Prior to that, in 2017, Hassan was the Executive Vice President and Global Chief Marketing Officer at Toys "R" Us. In 2016, she was the Senior Vice President of Global Brand Management of the Global Beverage Group at PepsiCo. During her thirteen years at Pepsi, she also served as Chief Marketing Officer out of the Dubai office.

A champion of equality, on International Day of the Girl Child 2019, Hassan's Citi team launched "It’s About Time,” which was later selected by GWI as campaign of the month. Hassan's Citi team worked in partnership with The Female Quotient to launch the Advancing Equality Calculator, a free tool to help organizations of all sizes calculate their raw wage gap and join the movement for pay parity.

Awards and honors
 2020, The Matrix Awards
 2019, Brand Innovators 'Top 100' Women in Brand Marketing Award 
 2018, Henry Crown Fellow in the Aspen Institute
 2016, Advertising Age Women to Watch

References

Living people
21st-century American businesspeople
Chief marketing officers
American women business executives
University of Colorado alumni
Thunderbird School of Global Management alumni
Lebanese emigrants to the United States
PepsiCo people
Citigroup people
Year of birth missing (living people)
Henry Crown Fellows
Refugees in the United States